Akel Gadallah (born 15 November 1972) is an Egyptian former footballer. He competed in the men's tournament at the 1992 Summer Olympics.

References

External links
 
 

1972 births
Living people
Egyptian footballers
Egypt international footballers
Olympic footballers of Egypt
Footballers at the 1992 Summer Olympics
Place of birth missing (living people)
Association football midfielders
Zamalek SC players